Cyperus schlechteri is a species of sedge that is found in Southern Africa, in the countries of Lesotho and South Africa.

The species was first formally described by the botanist Charles Baron Clarke in 1903.

See also
 List of Cyperus species

References

schlechteri
Taxa named by Charles Baron Clarke
Plants described in 1903
Flora of South Africa
Flora of Lesotho